Trabrennbahn Gelsenkirchen, also known as GelsenTrabPark, is located in the Feldmark quarter of Gelsenkirchen, Germany. The track, built in 1912, is used for harness racing and is the largest harness racing track in Germany, with a capacity for 30,000 spectators. The grandstand was built in 1965 and expanded in 1979, owns 9,600 seats on four floors and has a length of 112 meters. In 2002 the grandstand was renovated and a VIP-lounge called "Abano As Club" was installed. The track length is 1,200 meters and it is a right-handed course.

The highlight of the racing year is the "Bild-Pokal" on 1 May. Every year, a charity race day called "Schalke hilft!" is held in cooperation with the world famous local football club FC Schalke 04.

External links 

 Official website: gelsentrabpark.de

Horse racing venues in Germany
Buildings and structures in Gelsenkirchen
Sports venues in North Rhine-Westphalia
1912 establishments in Germany
Sports venues completed in 1912